The 12137 / 12138 Punjab Mail is a Mail train of Indian Railways – Central Railway zone  that runs between Mumbai and Ferozpur in India. It operates as train number 12137 from Mumbai CST to Ferozpur and as train number 12138 in the reverse direction. It is among the two daily trains that connect Mumbai and Firozpur, the other being the Firozpur Janata Express.

History

With the opening of the Indian Midland Railway's broad-gauge line between Itarsi and Tundla on 1 March 1890, the first through communication on the broad gauge between Bombay and Delhi was established. At the outset, 2 through carriages from Bombay were attached to the East Indian Railway's 5 Up Howrah–Kalka Passenger at Tundla. From thereon, the train ran through to Kalka and Lahore with the name 5 Up  Bombay mail. This pattern of operations continued until the early 1900s.

After the opening of the Agra–Delhi Chord railway in 1905, the Great Indian Peninsula Railway and the North Western State Railway started a new through service between Bombay and Lahore, going through Agra, Mathura, Ambala and Amritsar. The new service, christened The Punjab Mail, commenced operations from 15 March 1905.

From 1911, the Bombay, Baroda and Central Indian railway (BB&CIR) started operating a through train between Bombay and Peshawar, running through Baroda, Kota, Delhi and Bathinda, known as the Northern Express. In response, the Great Indian Peninsular Railway extended the Punjab Mail to run through to Peshawar. However, owing to the lack of line capacity, the Punjab Mail and the Northern Express ran together as a single train between Lahore and Peshawar.

Between 1928 and 1930, a flurry of changes took place in the train services between Bombay and Delhi. As a result of these changes, the Punjab Mail's run was terminated at Lahore from 1 March 1930. However, a bogie composite I and II class through carriage to Peshawar was still run on the Punjab Mail, being attached to the North Western Railway's mail train between Lahore and Peshawar.

From 1 April 1934, the Punjab Mail, which hitherto had been running through Ambala and Amritsar between Delhi and Lahore, was diverted to run through the BB&CIR's route through Bathinda and Ferozepore.

During the unrest following the partition of India, the Punjab Mail, along with a host of other trains running to Lahore and beyond, was terminated at Delhi. Shortly after the partition, the service was extended to Ferozepore on the India–Pakistan border. The train still runs on this route to this day.

Myths and misconceptions

Due to the paucity of research material, until recent years, most of the known history of this train was gathered through hearsay and anecdotal evidence. As a result, many sources cite that the Punjab Mail commenced services from 1 June 1912, as the Punjab Limited, operating between Ballard Pier and Peshawar. However, this is factually incorrect.

The Punjab Limited was a postal special train that was started by the GIPR from 27 October 1927, to provide a fast postal service between Bombay, Delhi, Lahore and Peshawar. This was a special train that ran in conjunction with the English mail steamer at Bombay and operated alongside the regular Punjab Mail. This special train competed with the BB&CIR's P&O Express. Due to the success of the BB&CIR's P&O Express, which later became the Frontier Mail, the Punjab Limited was discontinued after a short period. The Punjab Mail was unrelated to the Punjab Limited.

The Punjab Mail never operated from the Ballard Pier Mole station. On the GIP Railway, only the Imperial Indian Mail and the Punjab Limited operated from the Ballard Pier station.

Coaches

The 12137/12138 Punjab Mail presently has 1 AC 1st Class cum AC 2 tier coach, 1 AC 2 tier coach, 1 AC 2 cum AC 3 tier coach, 5 AC 3 tier coaches, 10 Sleeper Class coaches, 2 General Unreserved coaches, 1 Military Reserved coach & 1 Pantry car.

As with most train services in India, coach composition may be amended at the discretion of Indian Railways depending on demand.

It also carries a Railway Mail coach thus earning it the title of "Mail" in its name.

Service

The 12137 Punjab Mail covers the distance of 1930 kilometres in 34 hours 00 mins (56.76 km/hr) & in 33 hours 55 mins as 12138 Punjab Mail (56.90 km/hr).

As the average speed of the train is above , as per Indian Railways rules, its fare includes a Superfast surcharge.

Route & Halts

Traction
Now it is hauled by a Ajni-based WAP-7 (HOG) equipped locomotive from Mumbai CSMT till , handing over to a Ludhiana-based WDP-4D locomotive for its remainder journey until Firozpur Cantonment, and vice versa.

References

External links
 RunningStatus.in Punjab Mail (12137) - Up
 RunningStatus.in Punjab Mail (12138) - Down

Transport in Mumbai
Rail transport in Maharashtra
Rail transport in Madhya Pradesh
Rail transport in Uttar Pradesh
Rail transport in Punjab, India
Rail transport in Rajasthan
Rail transport in Haryana
Rail transport in Delhi
1912 establishments in India
Railway services introduced in 1912
Mail trains in India